Alexander Valentino "Tino" Acebo (September 5, 1927 – April 11, 2019) was an American politician who served for over 20 years as Vermont State Auditor.

Biography
Alexander Valentino Acebo was born in Barre, Vermont on September 5, 1927.  His parents, Fermin Acebo and Lorraine Elvira (Lastra) Acebo, were natives of Spain who immigrated to Vermont.  He was educated in Barre and graduated from Spaulding High School in 1946, where he played baseball, basketball, and football.

Acebo served in the United States Army beginning in 1946, including a posting to Japan during the post-World War II occupation.  He attained the rank of Staff Sergeant in the Finance Corps, and was discharged in 1949.

In 1952 Acebo graduated from Bryant College in Providence, Rhode Island, receiving a Bachelor of Science degree in business administration.  After graduating, Acebo was employed as an accountant at Modern Printing Company in Barre.  Active in local civic affairs, Acebo served as a member of the Barre City School Board, including time as the board's chairman.

Acebo began work in the State Auditor's office in 1961.  He was serving as chief staff auditor in 1970 when incumbent Robert T. King died in office.  Maurice T. Keefe, the Deputy State Auditor, declined Governor Deane Davis's appointment to the State Auditor's position.  Davis then offered it to Acebo, who accepted.  (Keefe continued to serve as Acebo's Deputy.)  Acebo was also selected by the Vermont Republican Party as its nominee for Auditor in the 1970 election.

In November, 1970 Acebo was elected to a full term.  He won reelection every two years until 1990, and served from September 1970 to January 1993.  He did not run for reelection in 1992.

Retirement and death
In retirement Acebo relocated to Wells Beach, Maine. Acebo died in Wells, Maine on April 11, 2019.  He was interred at Hope Cemetery in Barre.

Family
In 1950, Acebo married Lorraine Nancy Sauter of Madison, Connecticut.  They were the parents of three children, Wendy, Lynn Anne, and Mollie, and divorced in 1974.  Later that month, Acebo married Helen (Morrie) Franco (1928-2003).  They divorced in 1982, and in 1987, Acebo married Donna K. Murray.  They divorced in 1997.

Notes

References

External links

1927 births
2019 deaths
Bryant University alumni
United States Army non-commissioned officers
Vermont Republicans
School board members in Vermont
State Auditors of Vermont
People from Barre, Vermont
People from Wells, Maine
Military personnel from Vermont
Burials in Vermont
American people of Spanish descent